Achim Sidorov (born 24 August 1936) is a Romanian sprint canoer who competed in the late 1950s and early 1960s. He won two medals at the ICF Canoe Sprint World Championships with a gold (C-2 1000 m: 1963) and a silver (C-2 10000 m: 1958.

Sidorov also finished fifth in the C-2 1000 m event at the 1964 Summer Olympics in Tokyo.

References

1936 births
Canoeists at the 1964 Summer Olympics
Living people
Olympic canoeists of Romania
Romanian male canoeists
ICF Canoe Sprint World Championships medalists in Canadian